Animal Factory is a 2000 neo-noir film directed by Steve Buscemi and starring Willem Dafoe, Edward Furlong, Danny Trejo, John Heard, Mickey Rourke, Tom Arnold, Seymour Cassel, Shell Galloway and Mark Boone, Jr. Set in San Quentin, the film is about life in prison. It is based on the novel of the same name by Eddie Bunker who plays the part of Buzzard in the film.

Plot
Ron Decker, a young man convicted for drug possession, is sent to prison where veteran con Earl Copen takes Decker under his wing and introduces him into his own gang. Copen first helps out Decker when three Puerto Ricans attempt to lure him into a cell block to rape him. Copen sees through their plans and talks to the Puerto Ricans, who quickly abandon interest in Decker.

Over the next few days, Copen helps Decker out by getting him better jobs, food, and even transferring him to his own cell block. Mainly Copen helps Decker's case and points out that under a new article passed by the legislature, a judge can modify a sentence in the first 90 days if he sees fit, so Copen (who is the assistant to the Captain of the Guards) helps write false reports and gives Decker advice to stay out of trouble, which will make Decker appear as a "very small threat to society". Unfortunately, after a large inmate called Buck Rowan attempts to rape Decker in the bathroom, Decker stabs Rowan in a fight involving Copen, paralyzing Rowan. Rowan signs a statement claiming Decker and Copen are responsible and their cells are stripped and they are restricted to them.

Decker's attempt at a modified sentence is denied and his sentence remains five years. Meanwhile, Copen manages to get word out Rowan is "snitching", and an inmate working at the infirmary poisons Rowan's IV with cleaning fluid. The case against Copen and Decker is thrown out as the victim and main witness is dead.

Shortly after their release, Copen tells Decker he plans to escape, and they plot to hide in a garbage truck and avoid being crushed by the compressor by using a bar to stop it. Decker escapes in one truck, Copen is unable to jump into the truck after the appearance of one of the prison guards. Decker manages to flee to Costa Rica and Copen stays behind, after stating "This is my prison, after all" and quoting Satan from Paradise Lost by John Milton: "Better to reign in hell than serve in heaven."

Cast
 Willem Dafoe as Earl Copen
 Edward Furlong as Ron Decker
 Danny Trejo as Vito
 John Heard as James Decker
 Mickey Rourke as Jan the Actress
 Tom Arnold as Buck Rowan
 Seymour Cassel as Lt. Seeman
 Mark Boone, Jr. as Paul Adams
 Edward Bunker as Buzzard
 Shell Galloway as Johnny Handsome
 Michael Buscemi as Mr. Herrell
 Jake LaBotz as Jesse
 Chris Bauer as Bad Eye
 Mark Webber as Tank
 Steve Buscemi as A.R. Hosspack

Anohni makes a cameo appearance as a prisoner performing at a musical night in the prison.

Production
Animal Factory was filmed at Holmesburg Prison in Philadelphia, Pennsylvania. Filming was completed in 30 days, two days longer than originally scheduled. Buscemi employed hundreds of prisoners from Curran-Fromhold Correctional Facility, the prison that replaced Holmesburg Prison in 1995.

The film is based upon the novel of the same name by writer Edward Bunker. Bunker, who has a small part in the film, also co-starred alongside Animal Factorys director Buscemi in Quentin Tarantino's Reservoir Dogs.

Reception
The film received positive reviews. It was highly praised at the Sundance Film Festival. On Rotten Tomatoes, it has an approval rating of 83% based on reviews from 35 critics, with an average rating of 6.90/10. The site’s critics consensus reads, "Animal Factory is an honest attempt at a humanizing prison drama that stumbles with its performances but Buscemi's ambitious directing makes up for it." On Metacritic, it has a score of 65% based on reviews from 12 critics, indicating "generally favorable reviews".

Elvis Mitchell of The New York Times wrote: "Willem Dafoe steals the picture with his comic timing." Gene Seymour of the Los Angeles Times called it "One of the least sensationalistic--and therefore, more unsettlingly plausible--visions of prison life ever transfigured into big-screen drama." Alex Raynor of Empire magazine wrote: "Steady-handed direction and a number of strong performances allow Animal Factory to maintain a decent balance between prison violence and inmate camaraderie, making for a well-paced and thoughtful prison drama."
Leonard Maltin places the film in his book 151 Best Movies You've Never Seen.

References

External links
 
 
 

2000 films
2000 crime drama films
2000 independent films
American crime drama films
American independent films
2000s English-language films
Films directed by Steve Buscemi
Films set in San Quentin State Prison
Films shot in Pennsylvania
2000s prison films
Franchise Pictures films
Films based on American novels
American prison drama films
Films produced by Elie Samaha
2000s American films